is a railway station on the Keikyu Airport Line in Ōta, Tokyo, Japan, operated by the private railway operator Keikyu. It is numbered "KK12".

Lines
Through services operate to and from the Keikyu Main Line.

Layout
The station has two opposed side platforms serving two tracks on the second floor level. The station ticket barriers and facilities are on the ground floor level.

Platforms

History

The station underwent modernization work between October 1991 and March 1993, with a new station building and extended and widened platforms. In December 1994, the platforms were extended to handle eight-car trains inter-running to and from the Toei Asakusa Line.

Keikyu introduced station numbering to its stations on 21 October 2010; Kōjiya was assigned station number KK11.

The station was rebuilt with elevated tracks, completed in October 2012.

Passenger statistics
In fiscal 2011, the station was used by an average of 21,863 passengers daily.

Surrounding area
 Kamata Girls' High School

See also
 List of railway stations in Japan

References

External links

  

Railway stations in Tokyo
Stations of Keikyu
Railway stations in Japan opened in 1902